Steve Torrence is a professional NHRA Top Fuel Dragster driver for Torrence Racing. Most notably, he was the 2018, 2019, 2020, and 2021 NHRA Top Fuel World Champion. He has had a total of 57 Career Event titles and 87 Career Final Rounds.

References

1983 births
People from Longview, Texas
Living people
Racing drivers from Texas
Dragster drivers